Greg Weisman (born September 28, 1963) is an American novelist, writer, producer and voice actor. He is best known as the creator of the animated series Gargoyles, The Spectacular Spider-Man and Young Justice.

Early life and career
Weisman is a former English composition and writing teacher. He received a bachelor's degree from Stanford University and a master's from USC. Between college and graduate school, he worked on staff in the editorial department of DC Comics, while also co-writing Captain Atom with Cary Bates. When he was 22 years old, he wrote a four-issue mini-series for DC Comics starring the superheroine Black Canary; the first issue of the series was penciled, but the project was ultimately shelved due to the character being used in writer/artist Mike Grell's high-profile Green Arrow: The Longbow Hunters series. Elements from the ill-fated project were later used for his DC Showcase: Green Arrow short film.

Animation
After graduate school, Weisman worked as a development executive at Disney. There, in conjunction with others, he pitched an early comedy-adventure version of the TV series Gargoyles to Disney CEO Michael Eisner. Eventually, the idea underwent a transformation from Weisman's initial conception as a largely comedic cartoon, to an episodic but sequential animated action-drama, and the series was produced for syndication. Though Gargoyles itself bears no on-air creator credit, Weisman describes himself on his website as "one of the creators" of the show. Aired as a syndicated show for 65 episodes, Gargoyles was later picked up for a further 13 episodes by ABC. Weisman was credited as a co-producer of Gargoyles from episode 6, and as a supervising producer for much of the show's second season, but he has disassociated himself from the third season (The Goliath Chronicles). Weisman is notable for the question and answer forum he participates in with Gargoyles fans online.

Weisman's other television credits include overseeing the first season of Max Steel, the second season of W.I.T.C.H., and both seasons of The Spectacular Spider-Man and four of Young Justice. Weisman has written episodes for numerous animated series, including Men in Black: The Series, Roughnecks: Starship Troopers Chronicles, Bonkers, and Kim Possible. He also voice directs and voice acts on occasion; he played the role of Donald Menken on The Spectacular Spider-Man and Lucas "Snapper" Carr on Young Justice. Weisman was also executive producer on Star Wars Rebels, alongside Dave Filoni and Simon Kinberg, but left the series after the first season. In 2016, it was reported that he would return in the upcoming revival season of Young Justice, alongside Brandon Vietti; the new season, titled Young Justice: Outsiders, began streaming on DC Universe in January 2019.

Comic books
Weisman also continues to write for comics, including in continuity continuations of the storylines from the television series Gargoyles and Young Justice. On the latter, Weisman, along with Kevin Hopps, became full-time writers of the tie-in comic as of issue #7 (as well as issue #0). Weisman also wrote a parody of Gargoyles and Captain Atom in JLA Showcase #1. During his time with the Star Wars franchise, Weisman wrote the miniseries Star Wars: Kanan for Lucasfilm and Marvel Comics. From 2015 to 2016, he wrote the superhero series Starbrand & Nightmask, which lasted six issues.

Novels
After leaving Disney in 1996, Weisman spent two years at DreamWorks, where he created and developed a new television series called Rain of the Ghosts. When the series was not picked up, Weisman bought the property back to turn it into a series of novels. His debut novel, also titled  Rain of the Ghosts, was released in 2013. Its sequel, Spirits of Ash and Foam, followed in 2014. Weisman has announced that the third book will be titled Masque of Bones, and in 2015, he released a full-cast unabridged AudioPlay based on Rain of the Ghosts after successfully crowdfunding the project through Kickstarter. It was the most funded young adult project on Kickstarter. In 2016, Weisman released a children's novel in the World of Warcraft universe entitled World of Warcraft: Traveler, followed by a sequel, World of Warcraft: Traveler - The Spiral Path.

Weisman's next novels were set in the Magic: The Gathering universe. War of the Spark: Ravnica was released on April 23, 2019 and made the New York Times Best Sellers List. Its sequel, War of the Spark: Forsaken, was released in November 2019. Alexander Sowa, for CBR, highlighted that "Greg Weissman's War of the Spark: Ravnica [was] infamous among fans for its misrepresentation of existing characters". Sowa commented that its sequel, War of the Spark: Forsaken, "was greeted with a lukewarm response after it infamously attempted to retcon the sexuality of one of the book's protagonists, Chandra. As a result, the game's publisher, Wizards of the Coast, released an official apology for the novel's poor handling of the subject and canceled plans for the book that was intended for the game's next set, Theros: Beyond Death". Reactions to the sequel were "overwhelmingly negative" and it was "lambasted for its disappointing prose, lack of understanding of character voice, and failure to provide any emotional payoff for the relationships that have been set up in the world of Magic. One aspect that has been called out, in particular, is the biphobic language and erasure around the relationship between the Planeswalkers Chandra Nalaar and Nissa Revane". Weisman issued an apology highlighting the "mutual creative/editorial process with WotC and Del Rey" for Chandra's characterization. Wizards of the Coast made a further announcement that they would no longer censor the content in Magic: The Gathering novels to "accommodate foreign content restrictions".

Bibliography

Comic books

DC Comics

Marvel Comics

SLG Comics

Novels

Filmography

Film

Television

Video games

Audiobooks

References

External links
 
 Greg Weisman's official Facebook page
 Greg Weisman's interview on BAD GUYS & GARGOYLES comic books
 Greg Weisman discusses the new Gargoyles comic series
 Comic historian Alan Kistler interviews Greg Weisman about Spectacular Spider-Man
 Ask Greg – a Gargoyles forum

1963 births
American comics writers
American animated film producers
Television producers from California
American television writers
American male television writers
American male voice actors
American voice directors
Marvel Comics people
Marvel Comics writers
DC Comics people
Living people
People from Woodland Hills, Los Angeles
Screenwriters from California